Careby Aunby and Holywell is a civil parish  in the district of South Kesteven, south-west Lincolnshire, in England. It stretches from the county border with Rutland in the west to the River West Glen in the east.  The B1176 road from Corby Glen passes through Careby and on past Aunby toward Stamford.  The main London to Scotland railway line passes through the parish, the line upon which Mallard took the speed record for the LNER.

The total population in the 2001 census was 146, falling marginally to 143 at the 2011 census.  The population in 1801 was 65, and had risen to 133 by 1911

The centre of the parish is near

Places in the parish

Settlements
Careby  
Aunby  
Holywell

Other Locations
Castle Dyke 
Earthen banks forming the remains of a small moated medieval structure in the woods between Aunby and Holywell.
Lincolnshire Gate 
At the western boundary with Rutland there is a small but important Nature Reserve called Robert's Field at Lincolnshire Gate.
Stanton's Pit 
At the Eastern side on the lane to Witham on the Hill is a small but important Nature Reserve called Stanton's pit, a former sandpit now important to bird life.
Holywell Banks 
Grassland designated an SSSI.
Careby Camp 
An Iron-Age hill fort in modern woodland.

Geology
The parish's geology is a complex mixture of numerous strata of Jurassic rocks with the highest ground formed of glacial drift. The northernmost part lies on the gravels and sands which filled the valley of a Cromerian Stage river. To the east and west of Careby are patches of chalky glacial till, the eastern one overlying a thin remnant of Kellways beds with cornbrash fairly extensively exposed to its south. There are exposures of Blisworth clay, Blisworth Limestone, Upper Estuarine Series, and Upper Lincolnshire Limestone. Holywell’s quarries supplied stone for various building projects including Windsor Castle.

Administration
The ecclesiastical parish includes Careby Aunby and Holywell and is part of the Castle Bytham with Creeton group of parishes under the Beltisloe Deanery, Diocese of Lincoln.  The shared parish priest is The Revd Sue Evans.

Once part of the Beltisloe Wapentake in Kesteven, the parish is now part of South Kesteven District.  Its obligations under the 19th century poor law were undertaken by the Bourne Poor Law Union from 1835 onwards.

The present Electoral  arrangements are as follows:
 South Kesteven District Council, Hillsides ward – Councillor Elizabeth Channell
 Lincolnshire County Council, Stamford Rural ward – Councillor Thomas Trollope-Bellew
 Westminster, Stamford and Grantham constituency – Nicholas Boles MP
 European Parliament, East Midlands – Derek Clark  Roger Helmer Glenis Willmott  Emma McClarkin  Bill Newton Dunn 

In lieu of a parish council, local democracy takes the form of a Parish Meeting.

Economy and amenities
Most of the businesses in the parish are farms.  
Stanton's Pit is a former gravel pit operated as a wetland Nature Reserve by the Lincolnshire Wildlife Trust.

See also
Little Bytham
Pickworth, Rutland
Ryhall, for other holy wells

References

 Ordnance Survey map Pathfinder Sheet 877
 Institute of Geological Sciences map Sheet 143
 Soil Survey of England and Wales Sheet 4
 Ordnance Survey Map of Southern Britain in the Iron Age
 Map of civil parish boundaries from SKDC

External links

 Contact details for the parish council

Civil parishes in Lincolnshire
South Kesteven District